Katibah Nusantara or KN (Jawi:كتيبه نوسنتارا, meaning "Katibah Archipelago"), also known as Katibah Nusantara Lid Daulah Islamiyyah, Malay archipelago unit for the Islamic State in Iraq and Syria and Majmu'ah al Arkhabiliy, is a Southeast Asian military unit within the Islamic State of Iraq and the Levant, composed of Malay-speaking individuals, mostly from Indonesia and Malaysia, but also from the Philippines and Singapore. They received notoriety for being the perpetrators of the 2016 Jakarta attacks. It is made up of about 30 small groups.

Listed as terror organization by Malaysia.

History
Katibah Nusantara  was formally launched on 26 September 2014, headquartered in Al-Shaddadi, in the Syrian province of Hasakah. Its training ground is located in Poso, Indonesia. In early April 2015, the unit achieved its first major combat success by capturing five Kurd-held territories in Syria, speculating that the unit's main area of operations was still in Syria, before the 2016 Jakarta attacks.

Leadership
The unit's first known Amir, or leader, is Abu Ibrahim al-Indunisiy. Currently, it is unknown whether he is still leader, but it is alleged that either Bahrun Naim, mastermind of the 2016 Jakarta attacks, or Bahrum Syah has taken over leadership.

References

Paramilitary forces of Iraq
Organizations based in Asia designated as terrorist
Terrorism in Southeast Asia
Factions of the Islamic State of Iraq and the Levant